Dang Yanbao (born 1973) is a Chinese entrepreneur and a chairman of the Ningxia Baofeng Energy Group.  In 2010, he became a legal representative of the Ningxia Baofeng Group Co., Ltd. In 2020, the  Baofeng Group was ranked 307 among the top 2020 private manufacturing enterprises in China.

Dang Yanbao grew up in Yanchi County. Later he obtained an M.B.A degree from the Peking University. He is also a well-known philanthropist. In 2011, his wife Bian Haiyan and he established the Ningxia Yanbao Charity Foundation that aimed at sponsoring education and poverty alleviation. Only in 2019, Dang Yanbao donated RMB 302 million to Ningxia Yanbao Charity Foundation. As of 2021, the foundation funded  young students.

Dang Yanbao made the 2022 Forbes Billionaires List with an estimated wealth of $14.8 billion and occupied the 126th position.

References 

1973 births
Living people
Chinese businesspeople
Chinese billionaires
20th-century Chinese businesspeople
21st-century Chinese businesspeople